Cool as Fuck (printed on the sleeve as Cool as ****) is a 1990 5 track EP by the Manchester baggy group Inspiral Carpets. It is also a slogan featured on a series of the band's tee-shirts, that were reputed to have sold more copies than their albums, combined.

It was released as a 12" LP, a CD and a cassette. The cassette had all 5 songs on both sides. The EP was only released in the US.

Track listing

References

External links
Cool as Fuck at Discogs

1990 EPs
Inspiral Carpets albums